The phonology of the Persian language varies between regional dialects, standard varieties, and even from older variates of Persian. Persian is a pluricentric language and countries that have Persian as an official language have separate standard varieties, namely: Standard Dari (Afghanistan), Standard Iranian Persian (Iran) and Standard Tajik (Tajikistan). The most significant differences between standard varieties of Persian are their vowel systems. Standard varieties of Persian have anywhere from 6 to 8 vowel distinctions, and similar vowels may be pronounced differently between standards. However, there are not many notable differences when comparing consonants, as all standard varieties a similar amount of consonant sounds. Though, colloquial varieties generally have more differences than their standard counterparts. Most dialects feature contrastive stress and syllable-final consonant clusters.

Vowels

 

The graph to the right reflects the vowels of many educated Persian speakers from Tehran.

The three short vowels are only short when in an open syllable (i.e. without a coda) that is non-final (regardless of stress); e.g. "sound",   "God". In an unstressed closed syllable, they are around 60 percent as long as a long vowel. Otherwise all vowels are long; e.g. "firmer". When the short vowels are in open syllables, they are also unstable and tend to assimilate in quality to the following long vowel (both in informal and formal speech).

The Dari vowel  and the Iranian vowel  are, respectively, the unrounded and rounded versions of the same vowel. ('roundness' referring to the shape of the lips during pronunciation)

In Iranian Persian Word-final  is rare except for   "you" and nouns of foreign origin. Word-final  is very rare in Iranian Persian, with the exception being   "no".

Diphthongs
The status of diphthongs in Persian is disputed. This shift occurred in Iran but not in some modern varieties (particularly of Afghanistan).

 becomes  in the colloquial Tehran dialect but is preserved in other Western dialects and standard Iranian Persian.

Spelling and example words
For Western Persian:

Eastern Persian varieties (Tajik and Dari) have also preserved these two Classic Persian vowels:

(See .)

Historical shifts
Early New Persian inherited from Middle Persian eight vowels: three short i, a, u and five long ī, ē, ā, ō, ū (in IPA:  and ). It is likely that this system passed into the common Persian era from a purely quantitative system into one where the short vowels differed from their long counterparts also in quality: i > ; u > ; ā > . These quality contrasts have in modern Persian varieties become the main distinction between the two sets of vowels.

The inherited eight-vowel inventory is retained without major upheaval in Dari, which also preserves quantitative distinctions.

In Western Persian, two of the vowel contrasts have been lost: those between the tense mid and close vowels. In addition, the lax close vowels have been lowered: i > , u > ; this vowel change has also happened in many dialects of Dari. Modern Iranian Persian does not feature distinctive vowel length.

In both varieties, ā is more or less labialized and raised in Dari. Dari ō is also somewhat fronted.

Tajiki has also lost two of the vowel contrasts, but differently from Western Persian. Here, the tense/lax contrast among the close vowels has been eliminated. The back vowels have chain shifted as well. Open ā has been rounded and raised to an open-mid vowel  (compare with Canaanite shift).

A feature of Eastern Persian dialects is the systematic lowering of i and ī (both «и» in Tajiki) to e and ē (both «е» in Tajiki), and u and ū (both «у» in Tajiki) to o and ō (both «у̊» in Tajiki), directly before a glottal consonant ( or ) that is in the same syllable; loanwords from Arabic generally undergo these changes as well. However, since «у̊» (o, ō) has merged into «у» (u, ū) in most dialects of southern and central Tajikistan, «у» is realized before the glottal consonants in those dialects instead.

The following chart summarizes the later shifts into modern Tajik, Dari, and Western Persian.

{| class="wikitable"
! Early New Persian
! Dari
! Tajiki
! Western Persian
! Example
! Tajik
! Romanization
! English
|-
|  ||  ||  ||  ||  ||  || šab || night
|-
|  || ||  ||  ||  ||  || bād || wind
|-
|  ||  || rowspan="2" |  ||  ||  ||  || dil || heart
|-
|  ||  || rowspan="2" |  ||  ||  || šīr || milk
|-
|  ||  ||  ||  ||  || šēr || lion
|-
|  ||  ||  ||  ||   ||  || kay || when
|-
|   ||  || rowspan="2" |  ||  ||  ||  || gul || flower
|-
|  ||  || rowspan="2" |  ||  ||  || nūr || light
|-
|  ||  ||  ||  ||  || rōz || day
|-
|  ||  ||  ||  ||  ||  || naw || new
|-
|}

Consonants

Notes:

 In Central Iranian Persian  and  have merged into [~ɢ]; as a voiced velar fricative  when positioned intervocalically and unstressed, and as a voiced uvular stop  otherwise. Many dialects within Iran have well preserved the distinction.

Allophonic variation
The voiceless obstruents  are aspirated much like their English counterparts: they become aspirated when they begin a syllable, though aspiration is not contrastive. They are also aspirated at the end of syllables, although not as strongly.

The velar stops  are palatalized before front vowels or at the end of a syllable.

In Classical Persian, the uvular consonants  and  denoted the original Arabic phonemes, the fricative  and the plosive , respectively. The actual realisation is usually that of a voiced stop , but a voiced fricative ~ is common intervocalically. Zoroastrian Dari language and other Central / Central Plateau or Kermanic languages).

The velar/uvular fricatives are never fronted in such a way.

The flap  has a trilled allophone [] at the beginning of a word; otherwise, they contrast between vowels wherein a trill occurs as a result of gemination (doubling) of [], especially in loanwords of Arabic origin. Only [] occurs before and after consonants; in word-final position, it is usually a free variation between a flap or a trill when followed by a consonant or a pause, but flap is more common, only flap before vowel-initial words.

The velar nasal  is an allophone of  before , and the uvular nasal  before .

 may be voiced to, respectively,  before voiced consonants;  may be bilabial  before bilabial consonants.

Dialectal variation
In modern Persian  may be lost if preceded by a consonant and followed by a vowel in one whole syllable, e.g. 'sleep', as Persian has no syllable-initial consonant clusters (see below).

Spelling and example words

Before every initial vowel onset a glottal stop  is pronounced (e.g. ایران [ʔiˈɾɒn] ('Iran')).

This is represented in the IPA by doubling the consonant,   .

Phonotactics

Syllable structure
Syllables may be structured as (C)(S)V(S)(C(C)).

Persian syllable structure consists of an optional syllable onset, consisting of one consonant; an obligatory syllable nucleus, consisting of a vowel optionally preceded by and/or followed by a semivowel; and an optional syllable coda, consisting of one or two consonants.  The following restrictions apply:
 Onset
 Consonant (C): Can be any consonant. (Onset is composed only of one consonant; consonant clusters are only found in loanwords, sometimes an epenthetic  is inserted between consonants.)
 Nucleus
 Semivowel (S)
 Vowel (V)
 Semivowel (S)
 Coda
 First consonant (C): Can be any consonant.

Word accent
The Persian word-accent has been described as a stress accent by some, and as a pitch accent by others. In fact, the accented syllables in Persian are generally pronounced with a raised pitch as well as stress; but in certain contexts words may become deaccented and lose their high pitch.

From an intonational point of view, Persian words (or accentual phrases) usually have the intonation (L +) H* (where L is low and H* is a high-toned stressed syllable), e.g.   'book'; unless there is a suffix, in which case the intonation is (L +) H* + L, e.g.   'my book'. The last accent of a sentence is usually accompanied by a low boundary tone, which produces a falling pitch on the last accented syllable, e.g.   'it was a book'.

When two words are joined in an  ezafe construction, they can either be pronounced accentually as two separate words, e.g.   'the people (of) here', or else the first word loses its high tone and the two words are pronounced as a single accentual phrase: . Words also become deaccented following a focused word; for example, in the sentence   'it was my mom's letter on the table' all the syllables following the word   'mom' are pronounced with a low pitch.

Knowing the rules for the correct placement of the accent is essential for proper pronunciation.

 Accent is heard on the last stem-syllable of most words.
 Accent is heard on the first syllable of interjections, conjunctions and vocatives. E.g.   ('yes'),   ('no, indeed'),   ('but'),   ('why'),   ('if'),   ('thanks'),   ('Ma'am'),   ('Sir'); cf. 4-4 below.
 Never accented are:
 personal suffixes on verbs ( ('I do..'),  ('you do..'), ..,  ('they do..') (with two exceptions, cf. 4-1 and 5 below);
 the possessive and pronoun-object suffixes, &c.
 Always accented are:
 the personal suffixes on the positive future auxiliary verb (exception to 3-1 above);
 the negative verb prefix , ;
 if ,  is not present, then the first non-negative verb prefix (e.g.  ('-ing'),  ('do!') or the prefix noun in compound verbs (e.g.   in  );
Nouns not in the vocative are stressed on the final syllable:   ('lady'),   ('gentleman'); cf. 2 above.
 In the informal language, the present perfect tense is pronounced like the simple past tense. Only the word-accent distinguishes between these tenses: the accented personal suffix indicates the present perfect and the unstressed one the simple past tense (exception to 3-1 above):

Colloquial Iranian Persian
When spoken formally, Iranian Persian is pronounced as written. But colloquial pronunciation as used by all classes makes a number of very common substitutions.  Note that Iranians can interchange colloquial and formal sociolects in conversational speech. They include:
 In the Tehran accent and also most of the accents in Central and Southern Iran, the sequence  in the colloquial language is nearly always pronounced .
 In the Tehran accent, the unstressed direct object suffix marker   is pronounced  after a vowel, and  after a consonant.
 /h/ can be deleted in syllable-final position; e.g.   ('mountain') -> .
 Some consonant clusters, especially , can be simplified in syllable-final position; e.g.   ('hand') -> .
 The stems of many frequently-occurring verbs have a short colloquial form, especially   ('he/she is'), which is colloquially shortened to  after a consonant or  after a vowel.

Example

Notes

References

External links
 Persian to Persian dictionary with IPA pronunciation

 Virtual Persian Keyboard

Persian language
Persian phonology